Ninja Kamui is an upcoming Japanese anime television series that is set to premiere in the United States on Adult Swim's Toonami programming block.

Plot
After escaping his clan and going into hiding in rural America, former ninja Joe Higan is ambushed by assassins who exact bloody retribution on him and his family for their betrayal. After the attack, Joe returns to being known as Ninja Kamui to avenge his family and friends and sets his sights on taking down the very clan that made him.

Characters
Joe Higan

A former ninja who goes on a journey to avenge his family.

Production and release
The series was announced by Adult Swim on May 18, 2022, and will be directed by Sunghoo Park. Takashi Okazaki is designing the characters. The series will be produced by E&H Production and Sola Entertainment.

References

External links
 

Adult Swim original programming
Anime with original screenplays
Ninja in anime and manga
Toonami
Upcoming anime television series